Lars (Lauri) Johannes Ingman (30 June 1868, in Teuva – 25 October 1934, in Turku) was a Finnish theologian, bishop and politician. In 1906 he began to serve as the editor of Vartija, a Christian magazine. From 1916 to 1930 he was the professor of practical theology in the University of Helsinki. He was also a member of the conservative National Coalition Party, where he acted as the speaker of the parliament and a minister in several cabinets, and served as the Prime Minister of Finland twice, in 1918–1919 and 1924–1925. In 1930 he was elected Archbishop of Turku, head of the Evangelical Lutheran Church of Finland.

Cabinets
 Ingman I Cabinet
 Ingman II Cabinet

References

1868 births
1934 deaths
People from Teuva
People from Vaasa Province (Grand Duchy of Finland)
Lutheran archbishops and bishops of Turku
Finnish Party politicians
National Coalition Party politicians
Prime Ministers of Finland
Ministers of Education of Finland
Members of the Diet of Finland
Speakers of the Parliament of Finland
Members of the Parliament of Finland (1907–08)
Members of the Parliament of Finland (1908–09)
Members of the Parliament of Finland (1909–10)
Members of the Parliament of Finland (1910–11)
Members of the Parliament of Finland (1911–13)
Members of the Parliament of Finland (1913–16)
Members of the Parliament of Finland (1916–17)
Members of the Parliament of Finland (1917–19)
Members of the Parliament of Finland (1922–24)
Members of the Parliament of Finland (1924–27)
Members of the Parliament of Finland (1927–29)
20th-century Lutheran archbishops
People of the Finnish Civil War (White side)
University of Helsinki alumni
Academic staff of the University of Helsinki
Monarchists